Simone Rethel-Heesters (born 15 June 1949 in Herrsching am Ammersee, Bavaria) is a German actress and writer.

Biography
Simone Rethel is the daughter of painter and designer Alfred Rethel and the granddaughter of aircraft designer Walter Rethel. She is the descendant of historical painter , the brother of Alfred Rethel.

As a student in 1965, she played the main role in Axel von Ambesser's film  alongside Theo Lingen and Friedrich von Thun.

Rethel mainly appeared in boulevard theatre plays and had roles in numerous television series such as Der Kommissar, Derrick, The Old Fox, Schöne Ferien and Diese Drombuschs.

Simone Rethel was married with Johannes Heesters from 1992 until his death in 2011. Heesters was 46 years older than her.

Besides her acting career, Rethel was also a painter and a photographer. Since early 2005, she has been an ambassador of Altern in Würde and has raised awareness about Alzheimer's disease. In early 2010, she published her book Sag nie, du bist zu alt, in which she criticises negative view of society on ageing.

Filmography 

 1965: 
 1969: Junger Herr auf altem Hof (TV series, 13 episodes)
 1971: Der erste Frühlingstag (TV film)
 1971: Der Kommissar: Der Moormörder (TV)
 1972: Der Kommissar: Tod eines Schulmädchens (TV)
 1972: 
 1973: 
 1973: Der Komödienstadel: Kleine Welt (TV)
 1973: Der Kommissar: Der Tod von Karin W. (TV)
 1974: Der Kommissar: Mit den Augen eines Mörders (TV)
 1974: Die schöne Helena (TV film)
 1977: Es muß nicht immer Kaviar sein (TV series)
 1977: Tatort: Drei Schlingen (TV)
 1977: The Old Fox: Konkurs (TV)
 1978: Das Geld liegt auf der Bank (TV film)
 1978: 
 1979: The Old Fox: Neue Sachlichkeit (TV)
 1983: Omelette Surprise (TV film)
 1983: Der Trauschein (TV film)
 1983: Die violette Mütze (TV film)
 1983: Derrick – Die Schrecken der Nacht (TV
 1985:  (TV series, 5 episodes)
 1985–1986: Polizeiinspektion 1 (TV series, 2 episodes)
 1992–1993: Diese Drombuschs (TV series, 9 episodes)
 1992: Chéri, mein Mann kommt! (TV film)
 1993: Glückliche Reise: Neuseeland (TV)
 1994: Der Heiratsvermittler (TV film)
 1994–1996: Immer wieder Sonntag (TV series)
 1994: Drei zum Verlieben (TV)
 1995: Der Mond scheint auch für Untermieter (TV)
 1995: Zwei alte Hasen (TV)
 1996: Ein gesegnetes Alter (TV film)
 1996: Rosamunde Pilcher: Schneesturm im Frühling (TV)
 1996: Im Namen des Gesetzes: Das Heim (TV)
 1997:  (TV miniseries)
 1999: Theater: Momo (TV film)
 1999: Stubbe – Von Fall zu Fall: Die Seherin (TV)
 1999: Das Amt: Späte Liebe (TV)
 2000: Fast ein Gentleman: Der Gockl (TV)
 2003: In aller Freundschaft: Zurück ins Leben (TV)
 2008: Wege zum Glück (1 episode)
 2012: Die Garmisch-Cops: Badeschaum für einen Toten (TV)
 2016: Die Rosenheim-Cops: Schönheit hat ihren Preis (TV)
 2016: Schwarzach 23 und die Jagd nach dem Mordsfinger (TV film)
 2017: SOKO München: Altweibersommer (TV)
 2017: Sturm der Liebe (TV series)
 2019: Stuttgart Homicide: Kaffeefahrt (TV)

Publications

References

External links

Simone Rethel, Munzinger-Archiv 
 
 Simone Rethel, filmportal.de 
Simone Rethel's official website 

20th-century German actresses
21st-century German actresses
German stage actresses
German television actresses
German film actresses
20th-century German women writers
21st-century German women writers
21st-century German non-fiction writers
German women non-fiction writers
People from Starnberg (district)
1949 births
Living people